The 2021 Canadian Country Music Awards, honouring achievements in Canadian country music in 2021, were presented November 29, 2021, at Budweiser Gardens in London, Ontario. Hosted by Lindsay Ell and Priyanka, the ceremony was presented in-person, although due to the COVID-19 pandemic in Canada the venue maintained vaccination and social distancing mandates. The top winner of the night was Dallas Smith, who won three awards.

The event was webcast live on the Global Television Network's streaming app and Amazon Prime Video, with a repeat broadcast on Global's terrestrial television stations on December 3.

Nominations were announced on September 22, 2021.

Nominees and winners

Music

Radio

Industry

References

Canadian Country Music
Canadian Country Music
2021
Culture of London, Ontario